Hal Gordon Littleford Jr. (1924 – March 27, 2016) was an American football player and coach and politician. He was an all–Southeastern Conference (SEC) halfback at the University of Tennessee in 1948. Littleford served as the head football coach at East Tennessee State University in 1954 after three years there as an assistant. After retiring from coaching, he worked in real estate and served as the mayor of Johnson City, Tennessee, from 1967 to 1969.

Head coaching record

References

1924 births
2016 deaths
American football halfbacks
East Tennessee State Buccaneers football coaches
Tennessee Volunteers football players
Tennessee Volunteers baseball players
Mayors of places in Tennessee
People from Bristol, Tennessee
People from Johnson City, Tennessee
Players of American football from Tennessee